The 2018 Il Lombardia is a road cycling one-day race that took place on 13 October 2018 in Italy. It was the 112th edition of the Il Lombardia and the 36th event of the 2018 UCI World Tour. It was won solo by Thibaut Pinot, ahead of Vincenzo Nibali and Dylan Teuns. Pinot rode with a high tempo starting from the Civiglio climb 15 kilometers from the finish line and the other three riders in the lead group at that time (Egan Bernal, Vincenzo Nibali and Primož Roglič) lost ground to him.

Results

References

2018 UCI World Tour
2018 in Italian sport
2018
October 2018 sports events in Italy